The Madhya Pradesh football team is an Indian football team representing Madhya Pradesh in Indian state football competitions including the Santosh Trophy.

They have failed to qualify for the most of final rounds.

References

Santosh Trophy teams
Football in Madhya Pradesh